Hubert Hutsebaut (born 24 June 1947) is a Belgian former professional racing cyclist. He won the E3 Harelbeke in 1972.

References

External links

1947 births
Living people
Belgian male cyclists
Cyclists from West Flanders
People from Lendelede
20th-century Belgian people